2,4-Diaminopyrimidine is a diaminopyrimidine.

See also
 4,5-Diaminopyrimidine

References

Nucleobases
Aminopyrimidines